John Thomas Gegenhuber (born April 1961) is an American actor and voice actor. Since 2013, he has been the voice of Cap'n Crunch. Raised in Palatine, Illinois, his earliest screen-acting credit was in the 1986 PBS telefilm Under the Biltmore Clock. He has starred in several series, as well as appeared as a guest or recurring character on numerous shows, including Seinfeld (1993), Murphy Brown (1994), Star Trek: Voyager (1995-1996), Mad About You (1997), Law & Order (1997) and Seven Days (1999). He was one of the stars of the NBC series Earth 2 (1994-1995). He also appeared in the movies Straight Talk (1992) and Rookie of the Year (1993), and video games like Lego Dimensions (2015).

In 2006, Gegenhuber wrote, directed and starred in The Perverts. The pilot was entered in the 2006 ITVFest (Independent Television Festival) where Gegenhuber won the Best Directing Award.

A longtime teacher of the improvisation techniques of Viola Spolin, Gegenhuber became Education Coordinator for The Open Fist Theatre Company in Los Angeles, California in 2007.

Gegenhuber received his BFA in Acting from the Goodman School of Drama in Chicago (now The Theatre School at DePaul University). He also holds a degree in Graphic Arts (drawing, painting, and sculpture), and is a Le Cordon Bleu Chef and food writer.

Film and television appearances
The Patrick Star Show (2021-present) as Old Man Jenkins
Kamp Koral: SpongeBob's Under Years (2021-present)
SpongeBob SquarePants (2018-2021) as Old Man Jenkins, Walter Haddock, Barry, Impound Yard Worker
The Perverts (2006) as Bob
A Question of Loyalty (2005) as SS Man (uncredited)
The Making of Daniel Boone (2003) as Benjamin Logan
Seven Days (1999) (credited as John Wollner) as Lloyd Sype in "Pinball Wizard"
L.A. Doctors (1999) as Dr. Doug Carter in "Where the Rubber Meets the Road" and "True Believers"
The Pretender (1997) as Dr. Lawford in "Nip and Tuck"
Mad About You (1997) as Dr. Ben in "The Birth"
Law & Order (1997) as Pilot in "Judgement in LA: Turnaround"
Star Trek: Voyager (1995-1996) as Tierna in "Basics, Part 1" and Kelat in "Alliances" and "Maneuvers"
Earth 2 (1994-1995) as Morgan Martin
Murphy Brown (1994) as Sean Van Ohlen in "The Deal of the Art"
Grace Under Fire (1993) as Blind Mouse in "The Good, the Bad, and the Pharmacist"
Seinfeld (1993) Resident Doctor in "The Bris"
Rookie of the Year (1993) as Derkin
Straight Talk (1992) as Waiter
Under the Biltmore Clock (1986) as Chauffeur

Theatre appearances
Open Fist Theatre: The Room (Kermit Roosevelt)
Actor's Gang: Ugly's First World (Aleister Crowley) 
Goodman Theater: Puddin 'N Pete (Sal, Janskey) 
Goodman Theater: The Visit (Painter) 
Steppenwolf Theater: Harvey (Wilson) 
Coast Playhouse: Help! (Garwood) 
Arena Stage: Crime and Punishment (Lebeziantnikov) 
Arena Stage: The Wild Duck (Molvig) 
Arena Stage: Women and Water (Amos Mason) 
Arena Stage: Good Person of Setzuan (Wang) 
Arena Stage: Taming of the Shrew (Biondello) 
Northlight Theater: The White Plague (Dr. Galen) 
Northlight Theater: Teibele and her Demon (Beadle) 
Northlight Theater: Heart of a Dog The Adding Machine (u/s Frank Galati Hystopolis Puppet Thtr Mr. Zero) 
Stormfield Theater: The Sons of Corl Gap (Henry) 
Library Theater: Caligula (Scipio) 
Library Theater: Edward II (Gaveston)

Video game appearances
Lego Dimensions (2015) as voice of Cragger from Lego Legends of Chima
Dishonored 2 (2016) as voice of Kirin Jindosh
SpongeBob SquarePants: The Cosmic Shake (2023) as voices of Old Man Jenkins, Arcade Machine, Citizens

References

External links
 
 The Perverts Official Website
 The Open Fist Theatre Company Website
 The Theatre School at DePaul University
 Le Cordon Bleu Schools USA

Living people
People from Palatine, Illinois
Male actors from Illinois
American male film actors
American male television actors
American male stage actors
American male video game actors
DePaul University alumni
1961 births